Carlos António Fernandes was the Angolan minister for transport from 1987 to 1990.

References 

Possibly living people
Year of birth missing (living people)
Angolan politicians